David Worth Clark, aka D. Worth Clark (April 2, 1902June 19, 1955), was a Democratic congressman and United States Senator from Idaho, its  first U.S. Senator born in the state.

Early years
Clark was born in Idaho Falls, Idaho and attended public schools there. He attended Columbia University in Portland, Oregon, and the University of Notre Dame in South Bend, Indiana, where he earned a bachelor's degree in 1922.

Clark graduated from Harvard Law School in 1925 and was admitted to the bar that year. He commenced practice in Idaho at Pocatello, and was the state's assistant attorney general from 1933 to 1935.

Congress

House
Clark was elected to the U.S. House from the 2nd district of Idaho in 1934. The seat had been vacant for several months, since the untimely death of Thomas Coffin in June. Clark was re-elected in 1936, defeating his successor, newspaper publisher Henry Dworshak of Burley.

Senate
Clark ran for the U.S. Senate in 1938 and won the Democratic primary in August
over incumbent James Pope of Boise, a setback for New Deal supporters. In the general election, Clark defeated Republican former state Representative Donald Callahan of Wallace. Six years later, he was defeated for renomination in the 1944 Democratic primary by Glen H. Taylor of Pocatello.

Clark vied to reclaim his Senate seat in 1950 and defeated Taylor in the primary, as Taylor became the third consecutive incumbent of that Senate seat to lose in the Democratic primary. In the general election in November, Clark lost to Republican state Senator Herman Welker of Payette, as all four congressional seats (two House, two Senate) went to Republicans. Welker aligned himself in the Senate with the infamous Joseph McCarthy of Wisconsin and lost his re-election bid in 1956 to 32 year-old Frank Church of Boise (husband of his cousin, Bethine), who served four terms.

After Congress

Death
While watching television with his wife and youngest daughter, Clark died of a heart attack at his southern California home at age 53 on June 19, 1955, and was buried in Holy Cross Cemetery in Culver City, California.

Personal
Clark was a member of a prominent Idaho political family; his uncles Barzilla Clark and Chase Clark both served as governor of Idaho. His cousin Bethine, Chase Clark's daughter, married future U.S. Senator Frank Church in 1947.

Clark's wife Virgil (1901–1991) was a sister-in-law of Robert Smylie; the three-term (1955–1967) Republican governor of Idaho married her younger sister Lucile.

References

External links

Idaho State Historical Society entry (PDF - requires reader)
Boise State University Library – D. Worth Clark (1902–1955) – papers, 1935–1950

1902 births
1955 deaths
University of Notre Dame alumni
Harvard Law School alumni
Democratic Party United States senators from Idaho
People from Idaho Falls, Idaho
Democratic Party members of the United States House of Representatives from Idaho
20th-century American politicians
Old Right (United States)